Kalgan is a small town in the Great Southern region of Western Australia.

The town is situated on the banks of the Kalgan River and was first known as Kalganup which means "place of first camp" or "place of many waters". Indigenous Australians used the area as a meeting place up to 19,000 years ago. The name was first recorded in 1831 when explorer Alexander Collie charted the area.

Land was set aside for a townsite in 1837 and was sparsely settled, with approximately a dozen people living in the area in 1900.

The town was gazetted in 1912 following land being opened up in the area.
The Upper Kalgan Hall was constructed in 1912 and became a focal point for the community. By 1913 the population was approximately 150 people.

The Lower Kalgan Hall was constructed in 1954. Both the lower and Upper Halls are on the Heritage Council of Western Australia listed places.

An independent school, Great Southern Grammar, was built along Oyster Harbour near where the Kalgan River discharges into the harbour. The school was established in 1999 and is the only school in Kalgan.

References 

Towns in Western Australia
Great Southern (Western Australia)